Bambusa basihirsutoides is a species of Bambusa bamboo.

Synonyms 
Bambusa baishirsutoides has 1 synonym.

Distribution 
Bambusa basihirsutoides is commonly found in Guangdong province and Zhejiang province of China.

Description 
Bambusa basihirsutoides has 6 anthers growing to 7 mm in length and 2 to 3 stigmas. It is perennial and caespitose with rhizomes. Its culms are erect, allowing it to grow up to a height of 700–1200 cm long; This is enabled by a woody stem without nodal roots that grow to 60–90 millimeters in diameter.

References 

basihirsutoides
Bambusa basihirsutoides
Bambusa basihirsutoides
Plants described in 2009